The Georgia General Assembly is the state legislature of the U.S. state of Georgia. It is bicameral, consisting of the Senate and the House of Representatives. 68 seated committees are operated: 29 senate committees, 37 house committees, and 2 joint committees. The following list shows these committees :

Joint legislative committees
 Legislative Services
 MARTOC- Metropolitan Atlanta Rapid Transit Overview Committee. Provides oversight of the Metro Atlanta Rapid Transit Authority (MARTA).

Senate committees
 Administrative Affairs
 Agriculture and Consumer Affairs
 Appropriations
 Assignments
 Banking and Financial Institutions
 Economic Development
 Education and Youth
 Ethics
 Finance
 Government Oversight
 Health and Human Services
 Higher Education
 Insurance and Labor
 Interstate Cooperation
 Judiciary
 Judiciary Non-Civil
 Natural Resources and the Environment
 Public Safety
 Reapportionment and Redistricting
 Regulated Industries and Utilities
 Retirement
 Rules
 Science and Technology
 Special Judiciary
 State and Local Governmental Operations
 State Institutions and Property
 Transportation
 Urban Affairs
 Veterans, Military and Homeland Security

House committees
 Agriculture & Consumer Affairs
 Appropriations
 Banks & Banking
 Budget and Fiscal Affairs Oversight
 Code Revision
 Defense & Veterans Affairs
 Economic Development & Tourism
 Education
 Energy, Utilities & Telecommunications
 Ethics
 Game, Fish, & Parks
 Governmental Affairs
 Health & Human Services
 Higher Education
 Human Relations & Aging
 Industry and Labor
 Information and Audits
 Insurance
 Interstate Cooperation
 Intragovernmental Coordination
 Judiciary
 Judiciary Non-Civil
 Juvenile Justice
 Legislative & Congressional Reapportionment
 Motor Vehicles
 Natural Resources & Environment
 Public Safety and Homeland Security
 Regulated Industries
 Retirement
 Rules
 Science and Technology
 Small Business Development
 Special Rules
 State Planning & Community Affairs
 State Properties
 Transportation
 Ways & Means

See also

 List of United States state legislatures

References

External links
 Welcome to the Georgia General Assembly Legis.ga.gov. Retrieved June 10, 2013.

Georgia General Assembly
Bicameral legislatures
Georgia